Kala or Kalah may refer to:

Religion
Kāla, a Sanskrit word meaning "time" or "black"; in various Indic religions, the personification of time as a deity
Kāla, an epithet of the Hindu god Yama
Kāla, an epithet of the Hindu god Shiva
Not to be confused with other deities such as Kala Bhairava, Kala Ratri, Kala Bo or Batara Kala
Kalā, a Sanskrit word meaning "performing arts"

Art and entertainment

Films
Kala (2021 film), an Indian Malayalam-language film directed by Rohith V. S.
Dead Time: Kala, a 2007 Indonesian film also known as Kala

Fictional characters
Kala (comics), a Marvel Comics character
Kala (Tarzan), a character in the Tarzan novels
Kala, a black panther character in the animated Jungle Book
Kala, a character in the 1987 Teenage Mutant Ninja Turtles TV series
Kala, a character in Netflix original series Sense8
King Kala, a character in Flash Gordon
General Kala, in the 1980 film

Music
Kala (album), a 2007 album by British musical artist M.I.A.
Kala Tour, the tour associated with the album
KALA, a 2015 album by singer/songwriter Trevor Hall
Kala (band), a Filipino band

Other uses in art and entertainment
Kalā, a Sanskrit word meaning "performing arts"
Kala (choreographer), Indian choreographer
Kalah, a game in the mancala family that is alternatively spelled Kala

Places
Kala can be an alternate spelling of qal'a ("fortress") in Persian, Turkish, etc.

Albania
Kala e Dodës, a municipality in Dibër County

Algeria
El Kala District, district
El Kala, the district seat
El Kala National Park, national park in El Kala District

Iran
Kala, Behshahr, Mazandaran Province
Kalah, Hormozgan, village in Hormozgan Province
Kala, Markazi, village
Kala, Nur, Mazandaran Province
Kala, Semnan, village

Kyrgyzstan
Kala, Kyrgyzstan, village

Nigeria
Kala, a town in Kala/Balge Local Government Area of Borno State

Norway
Kala, Sarpsborg, small residential place

Pakistan
Kala Board, neighbourhood in Karachi, Sindh
Kala Gujran, town in Punjab
Kala, Punjab, district

Tanzania
Kala, Tanzania, port in the town of Kasanga

Other uses
Kala (choreographer), Indian choreographer
KALA (FM), a radio station (88.5 FM) licensed to Davenport, Iowa, United States
KALA (AM), a defunct radio station (1400 AM) licensed to Sitka, Alaska, United States 
Kala (name) a given name and surname (including a list of people with the name)
, the spelling in modern orthography of the native name for the Hawaiian dollar
The Hawaiian name for the bluespine unicornfish

See also
 Kaala (disambiguation)
 Kahla (disambiguation)
 Kalaa, Algeria
 Kalas (disambiguation)
 Kalla (disambiguation)
 Cala (disambiguation)
 Qala (disambiguation) or qal'a, the Arabic word for fortress or castle
 Qalat (disambiguation), places whose names contain the words Qalat, Qelat, Kalat, Kalaat, Kalut, or Kelat
 Qila (disambiguation), a Persian (Urdu, Hindi) variant of Arabic qal'a